Anne-Sophie Harsch (born 3 August 1999) is a Luxembourgian racing cyclist. She rode in the women's road race event at the 2018 UCI Road World Championships.

References

1999 births
Living people
Luxembourgian female cyclists
Place of birth missing (living people)
European Games competitors for Luxembourg
Cyclists at the 2019 European Games